Andriy or Andrii is the Ukrainian form of a masculine given name. The name is equivalent of Andrew in the English language.

Given name 
People with this name include

See also
 Ukrainian name
 Andrei, a Russian name
 Andrzej, a Polish name
 Andrey Sheptytsky, Metropolitan Galicia, Archbishop of Lviv (Lemberg)
 Andriychuk
 Andreychuk
 Andrija
 Andriyivskyy Descent
 Andriivka, Ivankiv Raion
 Andriivka, Mashivka Raion

References